Gerad Dhidhin, also known as Gerad Abdulahi, was the founder of the Warsangali Sultanate in the late 13th century in the territory of present-day North Somalia.

Ethnic Somali people
Somali sultans
13th-century Somalian people